Huzurabad Assembly constituency is a constituency of Telangana Legislative Assembly. It is one of 13 constituencies in Karimnagar district. It is part of Karimnagar Lok Sabha constituency.

In 2021, the seat was vacated following the resignation of Etela Rajender and again re-elected on 2 November.

Mandals
The Assembly Constituency currently comprises four Mandals:

Members of Legislative Assembly

Election results

By-Election 2021

Assembly election 2018

Assembly election 2014

Bypolls 2010

Assembly election 2009

Bypolls 2008

Assembly election 2004

See also 
 Huzurabad
 List of constituencies of Telangana Legislative Assembly

References

External links
Huzurabad 2018 Assembly Results Boothwise

Assembly constituencies of Telangana
Karimnagar district